Nee Ko Njaa Cha (acronym of Ninnem Kollum Njaanum Chavum) (English:Kill you, then Kill Myself) is a 2013 Indian Malayalam comedy thriller film written and directed by Gireesh. The story, set in Kochi and Goa, follows the lives of three friends played by Sunny Wayne, Sanju and Praveen Anidil. Poojitha Menon, Sija Rose, Rohini Mariam Idicula and Parvathy Nair form the female leads. It is an unofficial remake of the 2008 English language film Forgetting Sarah Marshall. Shooting was carried out in Goa and some shots in Kochi.

Plot
Roshan is a cosmetic surgeon and a casanova by nature. Abu, a budding filmmaker and Joe, a TV show producer, are his friends. Joe has just been ditched by his girl friend Ann. A devastated Joe heads over to Goa along with his friends to get over the tragedy that has befallen him. At Goa, Roshan and Abu have a merry time with "spicy girls" Alice and Sania, while Joe stalks Ann who has arrived at the beach town as well with her new boy friend Peter. Meanwhile, Joe falls for Anjali, a hotel receptionist, and he decides to stay in Goa even after his friends leave for Kochi.

After all the adventure, Roshan and Abu, on their way back to Kochi, receive a phone call from the "spicy girls" informing that one of them is an AIDS patient and by now either Roshan or Abu will be infected. Roshan and Abu return to Goa to know more about the girls but in vain. A few days pass and then they get another call from the spicy girls informing that the infected one is Roshan. They also inform that they did this not out of sadism but was taking revenge on Roshan who had ditched their best friend Anita George who turned into a lunatic after the breakup and committed suicide. Roshan is devastated by the news of his disease. He feels a kind of loneliness.

Once he finds his ex-wife Maya with another man which adds to his feelings. It is shown that Roshan and Maya have been separated since six months after Maya discovers that her husband has been cheating her. When Roshan finds everyone moving away from him, he feels very lonely and decides to commit suicide. However, in the final scene, it is shown that the whole Goa episode was a trap planned by Maya, Abu and the spicy girls to prove Roshan the value of relationship.

Cast
 Sunny Wayne as Dr.Roshan Fenwickman
 Sanju Sivram as Abu Hameed Griekman
 Praveen Anidil as Joe Bilsken
 Poojitha Menon as Ann Mathews
 Sija Rose as Anjali Menon
 Arun Benny as Pappu Timmytom
 Rohini Mariam Idicula as Alice
 Parvathy Nair as Sania
Santosh Sleeba as Police
 Mithun Ramesh Guest Appearance
 Merin Mathew as Maya
 Shani as Peter Maximus
 Shammi Thilakan as Ravi Kumar K.V. (Police Sub Inspector)Guest Appearance

Reception
The film received mixed to positive reviews upon release. Veeyen of Nowrunning.com gave the film  rating and said, "Nee Ko Njaa Cha is a scattershot film that throws in a few sex jokes together, hoping to make a point eventually." Sify.com's reviewer gave the verdict as "Average" and said that the movie is "for those who are looking for brainless fun." The reviewer was highly critical about the cast performances and was not impressed with the direction or technical expertise. According to EnteCity, which rated the film , "The first half is a rip-rocker while the 2nd half though slower isn’t bad either leading up to a good unexpected climax. On the whole, it's a good entertainer which is likely to be accepted by the youth."

References

External links
 Official website

2010s Malayalam-language films
2013 romantic comedy films
2013 films
Indian romantic comedy films
2013 directorial debut films
Films set in Kerala
Films set in Goa
Films shot in Kochi
Films shot in Thiruvananthapuram